The 9th congressional district of South Carolina was a congressional district for the United States House of Representatives in South Carolina. It was created in 1813 as a result of the 1810 Census and eliminated in 1843 as a result of the 1840 Census. The district was last represented by Patrick C. Caldwell.

List of members representing the district

References

 Congressional Biographical Directory of the United States 1774–present

09
Former congressional districts of the United States